The Newcastle Grammar School is a dual-campus independent Anglican co-educational non-selective primary and secondary day school, located in Newcastle, in the Hunter Region of New South Wales, Australia.

School History 
Newcastle Boys’ Grammar School opened on the present site in 1859 in Berkeley House and operated until 1902.

Newcastle Church of England Girls’ Grammar School was officially opened on 22 July 1918 with an enrolment of fifty-six girls. While the School was briefly relocated away from the Coast in World War II.

The control and administration of the School was given by the Anglican Diocese of Newcastle to The Pittwater House Schools in 1976 until the end of 1991, and in 1978, boys were once again enrolled at the School.

In 1992, the School's administration was returned to Newcastle and Newcastle Grammar School is now governed by Newcastle Grammar School Limited, a non-profit Company limited by guarantee.

In 2018, Newcastle Grammar School celebrated its Centenary.

Affiliations 
Newcastle Grammar School is affiliated with the Anglican Diocese of Newcastle, the Association of Heads of Independent Schools of Australia (AHISA), the Junior School Heads Association of Australia (JSHAA), the Association of Independent Schools of New South Wales (AISNSW) and Hunter Region Independent Schools (HRIS).

Campuses
Newcastle Grammar School is situated on two campuses.

Park Campus
Park Campus students start in kindergarten and they benefit from a number of specialist spaces, including a library, music room and computer rooms. The Sandi Warren Performance Centre is used for musical productions, assemblies, physical education lessons, lectures and dinners. Park Campus is across from National Park which has sports facilities such as netball/basketball courts and large soccer fields. In addition, Park Campus currently caters for students up to Year 4, after which they move to Hill Campus.

Hill Campus
Located on The Hill overlooking the city of Newcastle and the beaches, this campus caters for students from Year 5 to Year 12 in a mix of historic and modern buildings. The areas of Hill Campus have names associated with various figures that contributed to the founding and leadership of Newcastle Grammar School and Newcastle. On the east side of the school are the two areas of the courts, which are used for physical education, and Stewart building, used as the office for sports teachers and the area for Years 5 and 6. The west side of the school is the Merrick Courtyard which acts as a sitting area for students and location of the Hill Campus canteen, art rooms, Year 7 student lockers and office area for the Heads of House for Years 7–12. The Parnell building has lockers, science labs, music basement, maths classrooms, the STEM department office and the Tyrrell Library, which is also the site of the offices for the Languages and Literacy department. The Hill Building is a four-story building designed for classrooms such as the languages of French, Japanese and Mandarin, kitchen areas for teaching VET Hospitality, a computer lab, English classrooms and office areas for the Global Studies Department. The roof of Hill has vegetable garden beds, bee hives and is otherwise used for special events. The Second Floor has the Year 12 Common Room and spaces for Creative Arts. The Hill basement is used for TAS subjects such as Technology, iSTEM and woodwork. Dividing the school into east and west is the Horbury Hunt Hall, used for assemblies and functions.

External links
 Newcastle Grammar School homepage

Anglican primary schools in New South Wales
Anglican secondary schools in New South Wales
Educational institutions established in 1859
Junior School Heads Association of Australia Member Schools
Education in Newcastle, New South Wales
1859 establishments in Australia
Anglican Diocese of Newcastle (Australia)
Grammar schools in Australia